Iheyaspira lequios is a species of sea snail, a marine gastropod mollusk in the family Skeneidae.

Description

Distribution

References

 Okutani T., Sasaki T. & Tsuchida S. 2000: Two additional new species to gastropod fauna of chemosynthetic site on north knoll of Iheya ridge, Okinawa trough. Venus 59(4): 267-275

External links

lequios
Gastropods described in 2000